A warning sign is a type of sign which indicates a potential hazard, obstacle or condition requiring special attention.

Warning Sign may also refer to:

 Safety sign, a sign that warns of a hazard, prohibited action, required action or equipment, and locations of safety equipment or exits
 Warning Sign (film), a 1985 American film directed by Hal Barwood
 "Warning Signs", an episode of the TV series The Walking Dead

Songs
 "Warning Sign" (song), by Eddie Rabbitt, 1985
 "Warning Sign", by Coldplay from A Rush of Blood to the Head, 2002
 "Warning Sign", by Nick Heyward, 1984
 "Warning Sign", by Talking Heads from More Songs About Buildings and Food, 1978